Elections were held in Prescott and Russell United Counties, Ontario on October 25, 2010 in conjunction with municipal elections across the province.

Prescott and Russell United Counties Council
The Council consists of the mayors of the eight constituent municipalities:

Alfred and Plantagenet

Casselman

Mayor

Councillors

Champlain

Clarence-Rockland

East Hawkesbury

Mayor

Deputy Mayor

Councillors

Hawkesbury

Mayor

Councillors

Russell

Mayor

Councillors

The Nation

2010 Ontario municipal elections
United Counties of Prescott and Russell